The 2023 Copa CONMEBOL Libertadores de Futsal will be the 22nd edition of the Copa Libertadores de Futsal, South America's premier club futsal tournament organized by CONMEBOL. The tournament will be held in Caracas, Venezuela between 21–28 May 2023.

Cascavel are the defending champions.

Teams
The competition will contested by 12 teams: the title holders, one entry from each of the ten CONMEBOL associations, plus an additional entry from the host association.

Notes

Venue
The tournament will be entirely played at the Poliedro de Caracas located in La Rinconada zone in Caracas, Venezuela. The Poliedro de Caracas has a capacity for 13,000 spectators.

References

External links

2023

2023 in Venezuelan football